Furudo Dam is an earthfill dam located in Toyama prefecture in Japan. The dam is used for irrigation. The catchment area of the dam is 2.8 km2. The dam impounds about 32  ha of land when full and can store 3495 thousand cubic meters of water. The construction of the dam was started on 1968 and completed in 1982.

References

Dams in Toyama Prefecture
1982 establishments in Japan